Scythris ethiopica is a moth of the family Scythrididae. It was described by Bengt Å. Bengtsson in 2014. It is found in Ethiopia.

References

ethiopica
Moths described in 2014